Galtara purata is a moth of the subfamily Arctiinae. It was described by Francis Walker in 1863. It is found in South Africa.

References

 

Endemic moths of South Africa
Nyctemerina
Moths described in 1863